PC Paintbrush was a graphics editing software created by the ZSoft Corporation in 1984 for computers running the MS-DOS operating system.

History 
It was originally developed as a response to the first paintbrush program for the IBM PC, PCPaint, which had been released the prior year by Mouse Systems, the company responsible for bringing the mouse to the IBM PC for the first time.

In 1984, Mouse Systems had released PCPaint to compete with Apple Paint on the Apple II computer and was already positioned to compete with MacPaint on Apple Computer's new Macintosh platform. Unlike MacPaint, PCPaint enabled users to work in color.

When Paintbrush was released the following year, PCPaint had already added 16-color support for the PC's 64-color Enhanced Graphics Adapter (EGA), and Paintbrush followed with the PC's advantage of EGA support as well. (The EGA supported 64 colors, of which any 16 could be on the screen at a time in normal use.)

Also following the lead of Mouse Systems and PCPaint, one of the first pieces of software on the PC to use a computer mouse pointing device, the earliest versions of Paintbrush were distributed by Microsoft, with a mouse included.  Both Microsoft and their competitor, Mouse Systems, bundled their mice with Mouse Systems' PCPaint in 1984. At Christmas 1984, amidst record sales volumes in the home computer market, Microsoft had created a "sidecar" bundle for the PCjr, complete with their mouse, but with their competitor's product, PCPaint.  With the release of Paintbrush the following year, Microsoft no longer needed to sell the software of their competitor in the PC mouse hardware market in order to have the same market advantage.

Microsoft's mechanical mice outsold Mouse Systems' optical mice after a few years, but PCPaint outsold Paintbrush until the late 1980s.

Unlike most other applications before and since, Paintbrush version numbers were recorded with Roman numerals.

Along with the release of Paintbrush, ZSoft, following in the footsteps of PCPaint&apos;s Pictor PIC format, the first popular image format for the PC, created the PCX image format.

Version history
The first version of PC Paintbrush released in 1984 only allowed the use of a limited EGA 16-color palette.

PC Paintbrush II was released in 1985.

PC Paintbrush 3.10 was released in 1986.

PC Paintbrush Plus 1.20 was released in 1987. 

In 1987 a Microsoft licensed version was released as Microsoft Paintbrush 2.0. It supported saving images in PCX or GX1 file formats. It featured adjustable palettes, different aspect ratios, fifteen  fonts and supported printers, amongst other options. A Windows 1 and 2 version, named PC Paintbrush 1.05 for Microsoft Windows was released the same year. A version called Publisher's Paintbrush allowed import of images via TWAIN-based capture devices like hand-held and flatbed scanners.

PC Paintbrush III was released in 1988, allowing 256 colors and extended SVGA resolutions were supported through the use of hundreds of custom-tailored graphics drivers.  The PCX format grew in capability accordingly.  By its final version, Paintbrush was able to open and save PCX, TIFF, and GIF files.

PC Paintbrush IV was released in 1989. PC Paintbrush IV Plus, an updated version released the same year, supporting scanners. Also in 1989, PC Paintbrush Plus 1.12 for Windows was released, eventually becoming the Windows Paint program.

PC Paintbrush Plus for Windows v1.5 was released in 1990.

PC Paintbrush V+ came in 1992.

PC Paintbrush for Windows 1.0 was adapted to the Windows 3.0 graphical environment in 1993. Support for 24-bit color and simple photo retouching tools were also added, as well as the ability to open more than one image at a time.  The program also added many simulations of real-world media, such as oil paints, watercolors, and colored pencils, and it had a number of new smudge tools that took advantage of the increased color depth.

Both PC Paintbrush and Publisher's Paintbrush were supplemented and later replaced with the more budget-oriented PhotoFinish, first released in 1991,  with version 4 released in 1994.

After ZSoft was sold, resold, and then finally absorbed by The Learning Company, an extremely low-priced and simple graphics application was released in 1994 under the title PC Paintbrush Designer.

See also
 Mouse Systems

References

1984 software
DOS software
Raster graphics editors